The New Zealand Under 19's rugby team was a team for players aged under 19 as a platform to the All Blacks. The New Zealand Under 19's have joined forces with the New Zealand Under 21s to make the new team New Zealand Under 20s for the all new IRB Junior World Championship, which commenced in 2008.

History
New Zealand Under 19 was selected for the first time in 1987, and were strong contenders during their time, having won the IRB Under 19 Rugby World Championship in:
1999
2001
2002
2004
2007 (Last IRB Under 19 World Championship)

2007 Squad

See also
 New Zealand national schoolboy rugby union team
 New Zealand national under-20 rugby union team
 New Zealand national under-21 rugby union team
 Junior All Blacks

External links
New Zealand Teams website

U